'''SRS PU College is a private co-educational pre-university college in Chitradurga district, Karnataka, India. Its abbreviation is Sri Ranganatha Swamy PU College. It offers Science and Commerce courses for PUC students. It has also partnered with Narayana Group for Providing coaching for competitive exams like JEE, NEET, K-CET, etc.  Courses offered here are PCMB, PCMC, EBAS, EBAC, etc.

References

External links
S R S Pu College at justdial.com

Universities and colleges in Chitradurga district
Pre University colleges in Karnataka